Events from the year 1215 in Ireland.

Incumbent
Lord: John

Events
11 November – Echdonn Mac Gilla Uidir, Archbishop of Armagh, attends the Fourth Council of the Lateran in Rome.
The port of New Ross is granted trading concessions from John, King of England.
Sir Geoffrey de Luterel is granted the townland of Cratloe in County Clare, including the Cratloe Woods.

References

 
1210s in Ireland
Ireland
Years of the 13th century in Ireland